Zauzou (Rouruo 柔若, Jaojo, Raorou;) is a Loloish language of Tu'e District (兔峨地区), Lanping County, Yunnan, China. It is most closely related to Nusu.

Distribution 
In Tu'e District, Rouruo is spoken in Tu'e (兔峨), Bijifeng (碧鸡风), Wupijiang (吾批江), Guoli (果力), Xiaocun (小村), Jiangmo (江末), and a few other locations. The two major dialects are Guoli (果力) and Jiangmo (江末).  provides extensive vocabulary word lists for the Guoli (果力) and Jiangmo (江末) dialects.

Innovations 
 observes a sound change of *r- > Ø from Proto-Loloish as a Nusoish innovation.

References

Works cited

 

Loloish languages
Languages of China